The 1976 Illinois Fighting Illini football team was an American football team that represented the University of Illinois in the 1976 Big Ten Conference football season.  In their sixth year under head coach Bob Blackman, the Illini compiled a 5–6 record and finished in a four-way tie for third place in the Big Ten Conference.

The team's offensive leaders were quarterback Kurt Steger with 1,243 passing yards, running back James Coleman with 687 rushing yards, and wide receiver Eric Rouse with 326 receiving yards. Offensive tackle Jerry Finis and linebacker Scott Studwell were selected as the team's most valuable players.

Schedule

References

Illinois
Illinois Fighting Illini football seasons
Illinois Fighting Illini football